Geoffrey Wallis Steuart Barrow  (28 November 1924 – 14 December 2013) was a Scottish historian and academic.

The son of Charles Embleton Barrow and Marjorie née Stuart, Geoffrey Barrow was born on 28 November 1924, at Headingley near Leeds.   He attended St Edward's School, Oxford, and Inverness Royal Academy, moving on to the University of St Andrews and Pembroke College, Oxford.

While still a student at the University of St Andrews he joined the Royal Navy. After basic training he was sent to the Royal Navy Signals School near Petersfield in Hampshire, but he was then offered the chance to go on a Japanese course. He passed an interview in the Admiralty and, as a sub-lieutenant in the Royal Naval Volunteer Reserve, joined the seventh course at the secret Bedford Japanese School run by Captain Oswald Tuck in March 1944 for a six-month course. After completing the course he was sent to the Naval Section at the Government Code and Cypher School, Bletchley Park. He was later sent to H.M.S. Anderson, a naval listening and decoding centre in Colombo, Ceylon (Sri Lanka).

He became lecturer in history at University College, London in 1950, remaining there until 1961 when he became professor of medieval history at the University of Newcastle upon Tyne, and then in 1974, professor of Scottish history at the University of St Andrews. He was Sir William Fraser Professor of Scottish History and Palaeography at the University of Edinburgh from 1979 to 1992.

He began his work by studying the nature of feudalism in Anglo-Norman Britain, but moved on to specialize more thoroughly on Scottish feudalism. His work tended to focus on Normanisation in High Medieval Scotland, especially in reference to governmental institutions.

Personal life
He married, in 1951, Heather Elizabeth née Lownie, with whom he had one son and one daughter. His daughter is Julia Barrow, who also became an historian and academic.

Publications
Barrow's more notable publications include:

Books
 Feudal Britain, (London, 1956).
 Robert Bruce and the Community of the Realm of Scotland, (Edinburgh, 1965; 4th edn., 2005).
 The Kingdom of the Scots, (London, 1973), a collection of his scholarly articles.
 Editor of The Scottish Tradition, (Edinburgh, 1974).
 The Anglo-Norman Era in Scottish History, (Oxford, 1980).
 Kingship and Unity: Scotland, 1000–1306, (London, 1981).
 Scotland and its Neighbours in the Middle Ages, (London, 1992) – another collection of his scholarly articles.

Editions of texts
 Editor of Acts of Malcolm IV, 1153–1165, (Edinburgh, 1960) – Regesta Regum Scottorum, vol. i.
 Co-editor (with W.W. Scott) of Acts of William I, 1165–1214 (Edinburgh, 1971) Regesta Regum Scottorum, vol. ii.
 Editor of The Charters of King David I, (Woodbridge, 1999).

Papers
 Barrow, G.W.S. 'Earls of Fife in the 12th Century', (Proceedings of the Society of Antiquaries of Scotland, 1952–53), pp. 51–61.
 Barrow, G.W.S. 'Religion in Scotland on the eve of Christianity' in Forschungen zur Reichs-, Papst- und Landesgeschichte, ed. Borchardt and Bunz (Stuttgart 1998) 25–32.

References

 'BARROW, Prof. Geoffrey Wallis Steuart', Who's Who 2009, A & C Black, 2008; online edn, Oxford University Press, Dec 2008. Retrieved 27 Jan 2009
 Barrow's Profile on the UOE Website



1924 births
2013 deaths
Academics of Newcastle University
Academics of the University of Edinburgh
Academics of the University of St Andrews
Academics of University College London
Alumni of Pembroke College, Oxford
Alumni of the University of St Andrews
British medievalists
English historians
Fellows of the British Academy
Fellows of the Royal Society of Edinburgh
Historians of Scotland
People educated at Inverness Royal Academy
People educated at St Edward's School, Oxford